The 1985–86 Gonzaga Bulldogs men's basketball team represented Gonzaga University of Spokane, Washington, in the 1985–86 NCAA Division I men's basketball season. Led by fourth-year head coach Dan Fitzgerald, the Bulldogs were  overall  and played their home games on campus at Kennedy Pavilion.

After four years away from the bench, athletic director Fitzgerald resumed his former role as

References

External links
Sports Reference – Gonzaga Bulldogs men's basketball – 1985–86 season

Gonzaga Bulldogs men's basketball seasons
Gonzaga
1985 in sports in Washington (state)
1986 in sports in Washington (state)